The 1968 NCAA University Division basketball tournament involved 23 schools playing in single-elimination play to determine the national champion of men's NCAA Division I college basketball. It began on March 8, 1968, and ended with the championship game on March 23 in Los Angeles, California. A total of 27 games were played, including a third-place game in each region and a national third-place game.

UCLA, coached by John Wooden, won the national title with a 78–55 victory in the final game over North Carolina, coached by Dean Smith. Lew Alcindor of UCLA was named the tournament's Most Outstanding Player for the second of three consecutive years. This UCLA team, composed of three All-Americans, Player of the Year Alcindor, Lucius Allen, and Mike Warren, along with dead eye pure shooter Lynn Shackleford (most of his shots would be 3 pointers today) and burly senior power forward Mike Lynn is considered to be one of the greatest teams in college basketball history.

The NCAA semi-final match between the Houston Cougars and UCLA Bruins was a re-match of the college basketball Game of the Century held in January at the Astrodome, in the Cougars' home city. The match was historic,  the first nationally syndicated college basketball game and the first to play in a domed stadium before more than 52,000 fans. It was UCLA's only loss in two years, a two-pointer, to the then-#2 Houston, but with UCLA's dominating center Alcindor playing with an eye injury that limited his effectiveness after being hospitalized the week before. The loss broke a 47-game winning streak for UCLA. In the March NCAA Tournament Final 4, the Bruins at full strength avenged that loss with a 101–69 drubbing of that same Houston team, now ranked #1, in UCLA's home city at the Memorial Sports Arena. UCLA limited Houston's Elvin Hayes, who was averaging 37.7 points per game but was held to only 10. Bruins coach John Wooden credited his assistant, Jerry Norman, for devising the diamond-and-one defense that contained Hayes.

Locations

The city of Los Angeles became the tenth host city, and the Los Angeles Memorial Sports Arena the eleventh host venue, of the Final Four. The arena, adjacent to the Los Angeles Memorial Coliseum at Exposition Park, was at the time the off-campus home of the University of Southern California, located just across the street from the park. The brackets followed the same pattern as the previous tournament, with two first round sites in the East and a combined Midwest & West first round site. Besides the Sports Arena, there were two other new venues used in the 1968 tournament, both in the west. The West regional games were held in the city of Albuquerque for the first time, at "The Pit" on the campus of the University of New Mexico. Salt Lake City hosted games for the first time as well, with Nielsen Fieldhouse on the campus of the University of Utah hosted the Midwest & West first round games. This would be Nielsen Fieldhouse's only time hosting games, with its replacement, the Special Events Center, hosting future games in the city. It was also the final time hosting for Kent State University; it would be thirty-two years before the tournament would return to northeast Ohio, with future games held in the city of Cleveland. Any future tournament games to be played in Los Angeles County would be played at The Forum, SoFi Stadium or Staples Center other than Pauley Pavilion.

Teams

Bracket

* – Denotes overtime period

East region

Mideast region

Midwest region

West region

Final Four

National third-place game

Regional third-place games

Notes
This would be the last year of the 23 team field, as the field would stay at 25 teams for the next six seasons until the expansion of the field to 32 teams in the 1975 tournament. 
Four teams - East Tennessee State, Florida State, New Mexico and Weber State - made their tournament debuts. Weber State would return to the tournament for five consecutive seasons; Florida State and New Mexico would not return until 1972 and 1974, respectively; and East Tennessee State would not return for 21 seasons, until 1989. 
Two teams - Bowling Green and Columbia - made their most recent tournament appearances in this tournament. They are tied for the third longest active drought behind Tennessee Tech (1963) and Dartmouth (1959), and are currently tied for the fourth longest drought all-time, after Tennessee Tech, Dartmouth and Harvard (1946-2012, 66 years).

See also
 1968 NCAA College Division basketball tournament
 1968 National Invitation Tournament
 1968 NAIA Division I men's basketball tournament

References

NCAA Division I men's basketball tournament
Ncaa
NCAA Men's Division I Basketball Tournament
NCAA Division I men's basketball tournament
NCAA Division I men's basketball tournament